Turkey Creek is a stream in Washington County in the U.S. state of Missouri. It is a tributary of Ditch Creek.

Turkey Creek, historically called "Turkey Branch", was so named on account of wild turkeys in the area.

See also
List of rivers of Missouri

References

Rivers of Washington County, Missouri
Rivers of Missouri